Ewing is a ghost town in Angelina County, Texas. It is located within the Lufkin, Texas, micropolitan area.

History
Ewing was the site of a hardwood sawmill that was in operation from 1920 to 1944. The H.G. Bohlssen Manufacturing Company was founded by H.G. Bohlssen and S.W. Henderson, and a mill was built near the Angelina River. It was capitalized at US$200,000, and 35 shareholders divided the stock amongst each other.  When Bohlssen died around 1923 (a stack of lumber fell on him), his widow sold it out to Henderson. Its name was changed to Angelina Hardwood Company.

One of the stockholders, James A. Ewing, requested his surname be used for the community's post office that opened in 1920. The first postmaster was H.G. Bohlssen's son, John, who also died at the mill after falling into a pile of sawdust that burnt.  Ewing then received its mail from nearby Huntington in 1944. 

A plantation in the area that belonged to the Ewing family had the largest number of slaves in the county during the American Civil War.

Ewing's population zenith was 1000, alongside several houses, stores, and churches [sic]. The community suffered a fire in the mill in 1924, which destroyed the town. It was forced to close from 1931 to 1933 during the Great Depression. The largest number of businesses in the town was eight in the 1930s, according to the Texas Almanac. The local mill produced  of hardwood each day and had 250 employees. It closed when the timber ran out in 1944 and due to the labor shortage during World War II. 

The next year, it had a population of 50 and had one business in operation. It then became a ghost town and is listed as an abandoned railroad station by the Texas Department of Transportation. 
Starting in the late 1980s, the town's spirit has been kept alive through yearly reunions of its former residents, held each fall in Lufkin.

Geography

Education
Today, the ghost town is located within the Huntington Independent School District.

See also
List of ghost towns in Texas

References

Geography of Angelina County, Texas
Ghost towns in East Texas